The 1998–99 Codan Ligaen season was the 42nd season of ice hockey in Denmark. Ten teams participated in the league, and the Rødovre Mighty Bulls won the championship. IC Gentofte was relegated to the Division 1.

First round

Second round

Group A

Group B

Playoffs

Relegation 

Although IC Gentofte would've avoided relegation, they chose to voluntarily be relegated due to financial issues. Gladsaxe SF took their place in the Codan Ligaen.

External links
Season on hockeyarchives.info

Dan
Eliteserien (Denmark) seasons
1998 in Danish sport
1999 in Danish sport